SPQR, an abbreviation for , is an emblematic abbreviated phrase referring to the government of the ancient Roman Republic. It appears on Roman currency, at the end of documents made public by an inscription in stone or metal, and in dedications of monuments and public and civil works.

The full phrase appears in Roman political, legal, and historical literature, such as the speeches of Cicero and Ab Urbe Condita Libri ("Books from the Founding of the City") of Livy.

Translation

In Latin, Senātus is a nominative singular noun meaning "Senate". Populusque is compounded from the nominative noun Populus, "the People", and -que, an enclitic particle meaning "and" which connects the two nominative nouns. The last word, Rōmānus ("Roman"), is an adjective modifying the whole of Senātus Populusque: the "Roman Senate and People", taken as a whole. Thus, the phrase is translated literally as "The Roman Senate and People", or more freely as "The Senate and People of Rome".

Historical context

The title's date of establishment is unknown, but it first appears in inscriptions of the Late Republic, from around 80 BC onwards. Previously, the official name of the Roman state, as evidenced on coins, was simply ROMA. The abbreviation last appears on coins of Constantine the Great (ruled 312–337 AD), the first Roman emperor to support Christianity.

The two legal entities mentioned, Senātus and the Populus Rōmānus, are sovereign when combined. However, where populus is sovereign alone, Senātus is not. Under the Roman Kingdom, neither entity was sovereign. The phrase, therefore, can be dated to no earlier than the foundation of the Republic.

This signature continued in use under the Roman Empire. The emperors were considered the de jure representatives of the people even though the senātūs consulta, or decrees of the Senate, were made at the de facto pleasure of the emperor.

Populus Rōmānus in Roman literature is a phrase meaning the government of the People. When the Romans named governments of foreign states, they used populus in the singular or plural, such as populī Prīscōrum Latīnōrum, "the governments of the Old Latins". Rōmānus is the established adjective used to distinguish the Romans, as in cīvis Rōmānus, "Roman citizen".

The Roman people appear very often in law and history in such phrases as dignitās, maiestās, auctoritās, lībertās populī Rōmānī, the "dignity, majesty, authority, freedom of the Roman people". They were a populus līber, "a free people". There was an exercitus, imperium, iudicia, honorēs, consulēs, voluntās of this same populus: "the army, rule, judgments, offices, consuls and will of the Roman people". They appear in early Latin as Popolus and Poplus, so the habit of thinking of themselves as free and sovereign was quite ingrained.

The Romans believed that all authority came from the people. It could be said that similar language seen in more modern political and social revolutions directly comes from this usage. People in this sense meant the whole government. The latter, however, was essentially divided into the aristocratic Senate, whose will was executed by the consuls and praetors, and the comitia centuriāta, "committee of the centuries", whose will came to be safeguarded by the Tribunes.

One of the ways the emperor Commodus (180–192) paid for his donatives and mass entertainments was to tax the senatorial order, and on many inscriptions, the traditional order is provocatively reversed (Populus Senatusque...).

Beginning in 1184, the Commune of Rome struck coins in the name of the SENATVS P Q R.  From 1414 until 1517, the Roman Senate struck coins with a shield inscribed SPQR.

During the regime of Benito Mussolini, SPQR was emblazoned on a number of public buildings and manhole covers in an attempt to promote his dictatorship as a "New Roman Empire".

Modern use

Even in contemporary usage, SPQR is still used in the municipal coat of arms of Rome and as abbreviation for the comune of Rome in official documents. The Italians have long used a different and humorous expansion of this abbreviation, "Sono Pazzi Questi Romani" (literally: "They're crazy, these Romans"). SPQR is also part of the coat of arms of the Capital Military Command of the Italian army (Italian: Comando Militare Capitale). 

In business, in English-speaking countries, SPQR is sometimes (humorously) used to mean "Small Profits, Quick Returns", often by people who have studied Latin at school.

Civic references

SPQ is sometimes used as an assertion of municipal pride and civic rights. There have been confirmed usages and reports of the deployment of the "SPQ" template in:

Popular culture 
SPQR is often used to represent the Roman Empire and Roman Republic, such as in video games and movies.
In the 2000 movie Gladiator, the Roman general Maximus (portrayed by Russell Crowe) has "SPQR" tattooed on his shoulder, which he removes by scraping after he is sold into slavery.

Gallery

References

Further reading

External links

 Instances of "Roman Senate and People" on Perseus.edu
 Lewis & Short dictionary entry for populus on Perseus.edu
 Polybius on the Senate and People (6.16)

Ancient Roman government
Latin mottos
Initialisms